The 1984 Tipperary Senior Hurling Championship was the 94th staging of the Tipperary Senior Hurling Championship since its establishment by the Tipperary County Board in 1887.

Borris-Ileigh were the defending champions.

Moycarkey-Borris won the championship after a 2-08 to 0-09 defeat of Lorrha in the final at Semple Stadium. It was their 11th championship title overall and their first title since 1982. It remains their last championship triumph.

Results

Quarter-finals

Semi-finals

Final

Championship statistics

Top scorers

Overall

In a single game

References

External link

 The County Senior Hurling Championship (1984)

Tipperary
Tipperary Senior Hurling Championship